Robin Haase and Tim Pütz were the defending champions but chose not to defend their title.

Marco Cecchinato and Matteo Donati won the title after defeating Sander Gillé and Joran Vliegen 6–3, 6–1 in the final.

Seeds

Draw

References
 Main Draw

Sibiu Open - Doubles
2017 Doubles
2017 in Romanian sport